Luigi Emanueli (4 May 1883 – 17 February 1959) was an Italian engineer. He is best known for inventing the oil-filled cable in 1924. In 1959 he was awarded the Faraday Medal.

References 

1883 births
1959 deaths
20th-century Italian engineers
20th-century Italian inventors